General elections were held in Mauritania on 8 August 1976 to elect a President and National Assembly. At the time, the country was a one-party state with the Mauritanian People's Party (PPM) as the sole legal party. Its leader, incumbent President Moktar Ould Daddah, was the only candidate in the presidential election, and was re-elected unopposed, whilst the PPM won all the seats in the National Assembly election. Voter turnout was 97.9%. They were the last elections held until the restoration of multi-party democracy in 1992.

The elections were held during a time when Mauritania along with Morocco held a treaty to partition provinces of Western Sahara during 1975 while independence was fought in the province by Polisario Front. Daddah claimed that the winning the elections was a mandate for annexing the provinces of Western Sahara.

Background
Mauritania came under the direct control of the French Colonial Empire during 1933. After independence on 28 November 1960, the country declared itself the Islamic Republic of Mauritania, with Ould Daddah becoming its first President . He declared the country a one-party state in 1964, and in 1965 all parties merged into the ruling Mauritanian Assembly Party to form the Mauritanian People's Party (MPP).

Daddah changed his stance from pro-French to nationalist during the early 1970s. He terminated the defense treaty with France in 1972, discontinued French currency bloc and nationalized French property. He also showed interest in annexing oil rich regions of Western Sahara, which was contested by Morocco and Algeria. A war erupted between Morocco and the Sahrawi national liberation movement, the Polisario Front, which proclaimed the Sahrawi Arab Democratic Republic (SADR) with a government in exile in Tindouf, Algeria. Although Daddah initially allied with Algeria in opposing Morocco, during 1974, he realigned his position and is believed to have made a secret agreement with the king of Morocco. This eventually led to an agreement in 1975 that partitioned Spanish Sahara between Mauritania and Morocco.

Results

President

References

External links

Mauritania
1976 in Mauritania
Presidential elections in Mauritania
One-party elections
Single-candidate elections
Elections in Mauritania
August 1976 events in Africa